Derrygonnelly Harps is a Gaelic football club from Derrygonnelly in County Fermanagh, Northern Ireland, founded in 1924. The club participates in Fermanagh competitions and has won the Fermanagh Senior Football Championship nine times. The club colours are purple and yellow.

The name Derrygonnelly (Doire Ó gConaile), when translated, means ‘The Oak Wood of O’Connolly’.
The Harps playing complex is about half a mile outside the village. Canon Maguire Park comprises the main playing field, a full size training pitch, a spacious changing room complex, a meeting room and a covered stand (Fermanagh’s first, opened in 1999).

The club draws its players from the parish of Botha, taking in the areas of Boho, Monea and Derrygonnelly itself.

History
The club was founded in 1924, with a Sligo man called John O’Grady one of the key movers in getting the club started. The club fielded its first Minor team in 1937, led by club member Eamon Maguire. There followed a lapse and the club was to reform once again in 1948 under the influence of Michael Farrell, Eugene Cassidy and Tom Fee. The Harps went senior in 1953 and were to experience glory at this level in 1959 when they became league champions by defeating Aghadrumsee on a scoreline of 2-5 to 1-4. Key figures on this team included Louis McGullion, Frank Gaffney, Joe Smyth, Raymond Dundas and Eamon Flanagan.
The club’s fortunes since those early days have remained good, safeguarded by a very positive grounds development programme (see later). Successes included Intermediate Championships in 1963 and 1970, a Junior League in 1976 (the Seniors lost the league final the same year.). By this stage, Boho St Fabers GFC, Junior Championship winners themselves in 1965, had amalgamated with the Harps. Senior and Junior titles were won in Division 2 in 1992, followed by what was undoubtedly the finest day in the history of the Harps, the Fermanagh Senior Football Championship win of 1995. The side that day was captained by Sean Flanagan and managed by Hugh Kelly and Donal Fee. The Harps lost League Division One Finals in 1995 and 1997 before claiming the championship title again in 2004 captained by Kevin Cassidy, 2009 captained by Aidan Gallagher, 2015 Senior League and Championship Winners double, repeat double as 2016 Senior League and Championship Winners, 2017 Senior League Champions.

The club purchased Sandhill Fields, later named as Canon Maguire Park, in 1958. The new pitch was officially opened on 13 May 1962.
The pitch was redeveloped as a Prunty Pitch in 1985. The main dressing room complex was opened in 1987. Intervening years saw the addition of ball stops, a scoreboard, the spectator stand and in 2002, the new training field. In 2010 the reconstructed Canon Maguire Park Main Pitch with Pathway / Fencing reopened.  In 2012 a new Two Storey Complex and refurbished Changing Rooms opened, built with much help from the members themselves.

Football titles
 Fermanagh Senior Football Championship 9
 1995, 2004, 2009, 2015, 2016, 2017, 2018, 2019, 2021
 Fermanagh Intermediate Football Championship (2)
 1963, 1970
 Fermanagh Junior Football Championship (5)
 1942, 1952, 2003, 2005, 2012

References

External links
Derrygonnelly Harps Club website

See also
List of Gaelic games clubs in Ireland

Gaelic football clubs in County Fermanagh
Gaelic games clubs in County Fermanagh